The Gizo white-eye or yellow-billed white-eye (Zosterops luteirostris) is a species of bird in the family Zosteropidae.

Distribution
It is endemic to Ghizo Island.

Its natural habitats are subtropical or tropical moist lowland forest and plantations.

Conservation
Zosterops luteirostris is a vulnerable species threatened by habitat loss.

References

External links
BirdLife Species Factsheet: Zosterops luteirostris (Gizo white-eye)

Gizo white-eye
Gizo, Solomon Islands
Birds of the Western Province (Solomon Islands)
Endangered fauna of Oceania
Gizo white-eye
Species endangered by habitat loss
Taxonomy articles created by Polbot